Yehu Orland (יהוא אורלנד; born September 14, 1981) is an Israeli basketball coach of Hapoel Emek Hefer Afula, and former basketball player. He played the shooting guard position. He was the 2013 Israeli Basketball Premier League Sixth Man of the Year.

Biography
Orland was born in Israel, and is 6' 4" (193 cm) tall, and weighs 205 pounds (93 kg).

He has played basketball for Hapoel Jerusalem in 2007-08, GreenTops Netanya in 2011-14, and Maccabi Ashdod in 2014-16. Orland was named the 2013 Israeli Basketball Premier League Sixth Man of the Year.

In 2019-20 Orland was head coach of Hapoel Emek Hefer Afula.

References 

Living people

Israeli Basketball Premier League players

1981 births
Hapoel Jerusalem B.C. players
Israeli men's basketball players
Israeli basketball coaches
Shooting guards